The Snows of Kilimanjaro and Other Stories is a collection of short stories by Ernest Hemingway, published in 1961. All the stories were earlier published in The Fifth Column and the First Forty-Nine Stories in 1938.

The collection includes the following stories:
"The Snows of Kilimanjaro"
"A Clean, Well-Lighted Place"
"A Day's Wait"
"The Gambler, the Nun, and the Radio"
"Fathers and Sons"
"In Another Country"
"The Killers"
"A Way You'll Never Be"
"Fifty Grand"
"The Short Happy Life of Francis Macomber"

Film adaptations
The Snows of Kilimanjaro (1952 film), a 1952 American film
The Snows of Kilimanjaro (2011 film), a 2011 French film
The Killers (1946 film), a 1946 American film
The Killers (1956 film), a 1956 Russian film
The Killers (1964 film), a 1964 American film
The Macomber Affair, a 1947 American film

1961 short story collections
Charles Scribner's Sons books
Short story collections by Ernest Hemingway